HMS Calliope was a 28-gun sixth rate launched in October 1837 and broken up in November 1883.

Career

During the period 1841-42 she served at Canton with Sir William Parker's ships in the First Anglo-Chinese War (1839–42), known popularly as the First Opium War.

Calliope under Captain Edward Stanley, left Plymouth, England on 18 August 1845, sailing for Hobart, Australia, via Madeira and the Cape of Good Hope. Upon arrival at Hobart the ship was sent to New Zealand, where she was stationed for 2½ years. The ship's Royal Marines saw action in the Flagstaff War in the north of New Zealand. A Royal Marine was killed at the siege of Ruapekapeka Pā and two seamen were killed in the Hutt Valley campaign. From late February 1846 until October 1847 Calliope operated mainly between Wellington, Whanganui and Nelson. The ship continues to be memorialised through the name of the Calliope Dock that was constructed in 1888 at Calliope Point, Devonport, New Zealand.

Sir James Everard Home was appointed captain of Calliope on 28 November 1850 and died in Sydney on 2 November 1853. A memorial to him was placed in St James' Church. Captain Gennys of HMS Fantome took command as acting captain. Captain Fitzgerald was appointed to take over command.

The ship was converted to a floating chapel in 1855 and was broken up in 1883.

See also 
 Henry Thomas Dundas Le Vesconte, later lost on Franklin's Expedition, served on the Calliope
 Patricio Lynch, Chilean sailor on Calliope

References

Further reading 
 

1837 ships
Corvettes of the Royal Navy
First Opium War ships of the United Kingdom
Ships built in Sheerness
Sixth-rate frigates of the Royal Navy
Victorian-era corvettes of the United Kingdom
Flagstaff War